Stuck on Nothing is the debut studio album by Philadelphia based power pop group Free Energy. It was released on May 4, 2010 on DFA Records. The album was produced by LCD Soundsystem producer James Murphy.

Release
The album was released digitally on March 9, 2010 and physically on May 4, 2010.  The first single was "Bang Pop".

Track listing

References

Free Energy (band) albums
2010 debut albums
Albums produced by James Murphy (electronic musician)